Salem Creek may refer to:

Salem Creek (Missouri), a stream
Salem Creek (Richardson Creek tributary), a stream in Union County, North Carolina
Salem Creek (Pennsylvania), a tributary of the Susquehanna River